Mosen Vicente Bru (1682–1703) was a Spanish painter.  He was born at Valencia. He was the pupil of Juan Conchillos. He painted for the churches in his native city, including a St. Francisco de Paula, a Baptism of Christ by St. John, and an All the Saints for the church of San Juan del Mercado.

References
Ceán Bermúdez, Juan Agustín (1800). Diccionario histórico de los más ilustres profesores de las Bellas Artes en España. Madrid. t. I, p. 179-180.

Palomino, Antonio, An account of the lives and works of the most eminent Spanish painters, sculptors and architects, 1724, first English translation, 1739, p. 148
Palomino, Antonio (1988). El museo pictórico y escala óptica III. El parnaso español pintoresco laureado. Madrid, Aguilar S.A. de Ediciones, p. 495-496. .
Ponz, Antonio (1774). Viage de España (Views from Spain). Madrid. t. IV, p. 61.

17th-century Spanish painters
Spanish male painters
18th-century Spanish painters
18th-century Spanish male artists
Painters from the Valencian Community
Spanish Baroque painters
1682 births
1703 deaths